Redfield College may refer to:

 Redfield College (New South Wales), Australia
 Redfield College (South Dakota), United States; defunct